Hassan Mohammed Ali Gafadhi is a Somali politician, who currently serves as the Minister of Planning and National  Development of Somaliland. He is the former Minister of Livestock and Fisheries of Somaliland.

See also

 Ministry of Planning (Somaliland)
 Ministry of Livestock & Fisheries (Somaliland)
 Politics of Somaliland
 List of Somaliland politicians

References

|-

Peace, Unity, and Development Party politicians
Living people
Planning Ministers of Somaliland
Government ministers of Somaliland
Year of birth missing (living people)